The Athens metropolitan area spans  within the Attica region and consists of 58 municipalities plus areas of East Attica and West Attica, having reached a population of 3,722,544 according to the 2021 census. Athens and Piraeus municipalities serve as the two metropolitan centres of the Athens metropolitan area. 

According to the Hellenic Telecommunications and Post Commission, the Athens metropolitan area consists of all areas with a dialing code of 21 and includes areas such as Salamina, Elefsina, Mandra, Aspropyrgos, Acharnes, Pallini, Agios Stefanos, Dionysos, Koropi, Vari, Kavouri and the Athens International Airport.

Administration

The Athens Urban Area, also known as Greater Athens, consists of 40 municipalities, 35 of which make up what was referred to as the former Athens Prefecture municipalities, located within 4 regional units (North Athens, West Athens, Central Athens, South Athens); and a further 5 municipalities, which make up the former Piraeus Prefecture municipalities, located within the regional unit of Piraeus. The four regional units of Athens , Piraeus and parts of East  and West Attica regional units combined make up the continuous Athens Urban Area.

References 

Athens